Singapore Airlines flies to 75 international destinations in 32 countries on five continents (as of June 2022) from its primary hub in Singapore. India is served by eight the highest number of destinations.

After the Asian Financial Crisis in 1997, Singapore Airlines discontinued flying to Kagoshima, Berlin, Darwin, Cairns, Hangzhou and Sendai. Toronto was discontinued in 1994. During the SARS outbreak in 2003/04, Singapore Airlines discontinued flying to Brussels, Las Vegas, Chicago, Hiroshima, Kaohsiung, Mauritius, Vienna, Madrid, Seattle, Shenzhen and Surabaya. In addition, Singapore Airlines discontinued flights to Vancouver (before the 2010 Winter Olympics) and Amritsar in 2009, and São Paulo in 2016.

Singapore Airlines presently operates the longest flight in the world, a non-stop to New York (JFK), using the Airbus A350-900ULR. Previously, it operated that route and one to Los Angeles with the Airbus A340-500 aircraft. All A340-500 were phased out in 2013 and direct flights to both destinations were suspended at that point; Newark was re-launched five years later. Nonstop service to Los Angeles was terminated on 20 October 2013 (the airline continues to serve Los Angeles from Singapore via Seoul–Incheon and Tokyo–Narita) and nonstop service to Newark was terminated on 23 November 2013 in favour of the Singapore-New York JFK route via Frankfurt.

In October 2016, Singapore Airlines restarted its nonstop service from Singapore to the US with the launch of its new Singapore-San Francisco route. The route flies A350-900 aircraft and includes Business, Premium Economy and Economy classes.

The former Capital Express Route linking Singapore and Wellington via Canberra was replaced in May 2018 with Singapore-Sydney-Canberra-Singapore and Singapore-Melbourne-Wellington-Melbourne-Singapore routes.

In September 2020, the carrier announced that it will suspend services to Canberra, Dusseldorf, Stockholm and Wellington due to a drop in demand arising from the COVID-19 pandemic.

List

Notes

References

External links

Destinations
Lists of airline destinations
Star Alliance destinations